Roy C. Wilcox (December 24, 1891 – March 30, 1975) was an American politician who was the 83rd Lieutenant Governor of Connecticut from 1933 to 1935. He previously served as President pro tempore of the Connecticut Senate.

He died at Meriden, Connecticut hospital in 1975 after a short illness. He was 83.

References

 

1891 births
1975 deaths
Lieutenant Governors of Connecticut
State treasurers of Connecticut
Presidents pro tempore of the Connecticut Senate
20th-century American politicians